Club de Accionariado Popular Ciudad de Murcia is a Spanish football club based in Murcia. Founded in 2010, it currently plays in Tercera División RFEF.

History
The club was founded in October 2010 by a group of supporters of dissolved CF Ciudad de Murcia, which relocated in 2006, and was founded after CF Atlético Ciudad, its original reserve team which de facto acted as its first team for four years, was dissolved in 2010. The club is owned and democratically run by its supporters.

On September 25, 2011, Ciudad de Murcia played its first official game in Segunda Autonómica de Murcia, seventh tier, and defeated CDA Ciudad de Cehegín by 2–0. In its first season, Ciudad de Murcia promoted to Primera Autonómica after winning 22 of the 26 games played.

The club repeated the success in the next season, promoting to Preferente Autonómica despite finishing in the fourth position.

On May 10, 2015, Ciudad de Murcia promoted to Tercera División for the first time since its refoundation. It would remain in the fourth tier only two seasons before suffering its first relegation ever.

Club background
CF Ciudad de Murcia - (1999–2006)
CF Atlético Ciudad - (2007–2010)
CAP Ciudad de Murcia - (2010–)

Season to season

5 seasons in Tercera División
1 season in Tercera División RFEF

Detailed list of seasons

Women's team
In February 2016, Ciudad de Murcia announced the creation of a women's team that would start competing in the Murcian Autonomous League. In its second season, the club promoted to Segunda División.

Season to season

References

External links
Official website 

Fan-owned football clubs
Football clubs in the Region of Murcia
Association football clubs established in 2010
2010 establishments in Spain
Women's football clubs in Spain